"Only When You Leave" is a song by English new wave band Spandau Ballet, released as the first single from their fourth album Parade. It peaked at number 3 on the UK Singles Chart and made the top 10 in several other countries but only reached number 34 in the US, where it was their last song to appear on the Billboard Hot 100.  Most critics were impressed with Tony Hadley's vocals and enjoyed the song. The music video used its theme of revenge as a way of paying tribute to the late film director Alfred Hitchcock.

Background
Spandau Ballet had their greatest success to date with their 1983 album True, which spent a week at number 1 on the UK Albums Chart and yielded 4 hit songs, including the title track, which became their first number 1 UK single. The band decided to continue working with their True co-producers, Tony Swain and Steve Jolley, on their next album, Parade, which was recorded in Munich. The band's guitarist/songwriter Gary Kemp described "Only When You Leave", the first single from the new album, as "a good mediator between True and Parade. It's got quite a bare arrangement, but it's still melodic, still soulful."

Music video
Although Kemp normally would come up with whatever concept or storyline was presented in Spandau Ballet videos, his focus on the new album meant handing over control of "Only When You Leave" to the director. Lead singer Tony Hadley summarized "Only When You Leave" as a song about "a lover's revenge" in explaining director Simon Milne's decision that the music video would interweave surreal vignettes saluting Alfred Hitchcock films with scenes of the band performing, noting that the late director's films were "all about romance, murder and revenge". Kemp explained that the vignettes, some of which borrow elements from movies like Strangers on a Train, are not meant to present an entire story, saying that "you just give people the general idea and they work it out for themselves." 

The entire video was filmed on a Battersea sound stage with minimal set decoration. A set of bleachers functions as a stage for some of the performance shots of the band, seating for an audience at an unseen tennis match, and stairs for various other scenes, one of which shows a young boy seated on them and dressed in white as he plays with a harlequin doll. A man smoking a cigar steps on the doll on his way up the stairs, and the boy's clothing changes at that moment from white to a dark shade of pink, a colour that predominates throughout. Dark pink fabric is  the sole backdrop for all of the scenes, and the actress playing Hadley's lover is primarily wearing dark pink clothing. At one point, however, she is shown alongside a matching 1949 MG, and both the colour of the car and her clothing change from pink to white when Hadley touches her shoulder. Their relationship is first presented as she steps backward  while Hadley falls to the floor as if she has just shot him. The same scenario is presented in reverse at the end of the video; he steps back as she falls to the floor. A scene at the start of the bridge to the song presents what looks to be her dead body being discovered by the tennis match audience members in the bleachers just moments after she and Hadley were in conversation. 

"Only When You Leave" was listed on MTV's reports to Billboard indicating what videos were in rotation on the cable network, making its first appearance there in the 14 July 1984 issue, which indicated that it had been added to their playlist as of 3 July.

Release and commercial performance
Recorded in spring 1984, "Only When You Leave" was released as a 7-inch single in the UK on 28 May of that year and peaked at number 3 there. It also reached number 2 in Ireland and the Netherlands, number 3 in Greece, number 4 in Spain, number 5 in Belgium, number 8 in Norway, number 10 in New Zealand, and number 34 in the US on Billboard magazine's Hot 100, making it their last chart entry there. Kemp was unhappy with the lower peak positions that their recent singles had attained stateside, which resulted in their move from Chrysalis to CBS Records in 1986.

Critical reception

At the time of its release, most critics applauded  "Only When You Leave" and appreciated Hadley's vocals. Paul Bursche of Number One magazine felt he was "emerging as a super crooner" and described the song as "superb pop". In their capsule review, the editors of Billboard magazine wrote, "Elegance, sophistication, panache and a dance beat to boot; unwonted restraint from singer Tony Hadley." Neil Tennant of Smash Hits concurred that Hadley "gives a warm, restrained performance on this funky and rockin' number which also displays Gary Kemp's talents as a scratchy rhythm guitarist." When his colleague Ian Birch reviewed Parade upon its release, he was effusive, opining that the song was "almost too good a start to the LP. Tony Hadley's vocals are more confident than ever; the production… is crisp and succulent at the same time; and the song itself is Gary Kemp's finest to date." Conversely, however, Graham K. of Record Mirror thought it was "their weakest offering for ages" and dismissed it as "a grandiose, empty re-write of 'Foundation'." In a negative review of Parades fourth single, "Round and Round", Phil McNeill of Number One admitted, "The Spands did achieve a kind of pleasant perfection on the wonderful 'Only When You Leave'."

In retrospective reviews, Ian Gittins described the song in The Guardian as typical of the band's move into "slick, chart-friendly shoulder-heaving soul". Peter Larsen wrote for the Orange County Register that it mines "a vein of soulfulness tinged with nostalgia and romance".

Formats and track listings7-inch single "Only When You Leave" – 4:48
 "Paint Me Down" (live) – 4:3912-inch single "Only When You Leave" (extended mix) –6:45
 "Only When You Leave" –4:48
 "Paint Me Down" (live) – 4:39

Personnel
Credits adapted from the liner notes for Parade:Spandau Ballet Tony Hadley – lead vocals
 Gary Kemp – guitar and backing vocals
 Martin Kemp – bass
 Steve Norman – saxophone and percussion
 John Keeble – drumsAdditional musician Jess Bailey – keyboardsProduction'
 Tony Swain – producer, engineer
 Steve Jolley – producer
 Spandau Ballet – producers
 Richard Lengyel – engineering assistance
 Pete Hillier – equipment
 Nick Sibley – equipment
 David Band – illustration
 Mixed at Musicland Studios (Munich)

Charts

Weekly charts

Year-end charts

Notes

References

Bibliography

External links
 

1984 songs
1984 singles
Spandau Ballet songs
Chrysalis Records singles
Song recordings produced by Jolley & Swain
Songs written by Gary Kemp